The 22127 / 28 Anandwan Express is a Superfast Express train belonging to Indian Railways Central Zone that runs between  and  in India.

It operates as train number 22127 from Lokmanya Tilak Terminus to Kazipet Junction and as train number 22128 in the reverse direction, serving the states of Maharashtra and Telangana.

Coaches
The 22127 / 28 Anandwan Express has 1 AC 2-tier,  4 AC 3-tier, 12 sleeper class, 3 general unreserved & two SLR (seating with luggage rake) coaches . It does not carry a pantry car.

As is customary with most train services in India, coach composition may be amended at the discretion of Indian Railways depending on demand.

Service

Schedule

Rake sharing

11079/11080 –  to Lokmanya Tilak Terminus, Lokmanya Express

Routing

Traction
As the route is electrified, a Bhusaval-based WAP-4 or Ajni-based WAP-7 pulls the train to its destination.

References

External links
22127 Anandwan Express at India Rail Info
22128 Anandwan Express at India Rail Info

Transport in Mumbai
Express trains in India
Rail transport in Maharashtra
Rail transport in Telangana
Railway services introduced in 2016
Named passenger trains of India